Conognatha pretiosissima is a species of beetles in the family Buprestidae.

Description
The basic color is metallic green, with four orange band spots on the elytra.

Distribution
This species can be found in Argentina and Brazil.

References

External links
 Coleopsoc

Buprestidae
Beetles described in 1938